Abdoulaye Diaby (born 4 July 2000) is a Malian footballer who plays as a defender for Hungarian club Újpest.

Club career
He began his career as a youth at Djoliba AC before moving to Belgium at the age of 19. He was loaned to Lokeren in 2019.

On 21 June 2021, Diaby signed with Újpest in Hungary.

International career
Diaby has played for Mali at the U17 and U20 level.

Career statistics

Club

Notes

References

2000 births
21st-century Malian people
Malian footballers
Living people
Association football defenders
Djoliba AC players
Royal Antwerp F.C. players
K.S.C. Lokeren Oost-Vlaanderen players
Újpest FC players
Challenger Pro League players
Nemzeti Bajnokság I players
Malian expatriate footballers
Malian expatriate sportspeople in Belgium
Expatriate footballers in Belgium
Malian expatriate sportspeople in Hungary
Expatriate footballers in Hungary
Mali under-20 international footballers